Frank Matteson Bostwick (April 13, 1857 – December 20, 1945) was a Commodore in the United States Navy.

Biography
Bostwick was born on April 13, 1857 in Janesville, Wisconsin. He married Elvira Gregg Hartwell on August 14, 1879. Bostwick and Elvira (1850–1912) are buried at Arlington National Cemetery.

Career
After graduating from the United States Naval Academy in 1877 Bostwick served on the  Pacific Station, at Mare Island Navy Yard, California, and on the Asiatic Station, until 1898. He served aboard the protected cruiser  during the Spanish–American War in 1898, and in Charleston, and on the gunboats  and  during the Philippine–American War in 1898–1901.

Bostwick was navigator and later First Lieutenant of the battleship  from March–October 1901, before taking command of the gunboat  in October 1901, then the cruiser  from May 1904, and the yacht  from September 1904 until September 1906.

He was a Lighthouse Inspector in the 10th District between  September 1906 and June 1908, then the commander of the auxiliary cruiser  from June 1908 until April 1909. From June 1909 to July 1910 he commanded the Portsmouth Naval Shipyard, receiving promotion to Captain in 1909, and retired at his own request, with the rank of Commodore, on June 30, 1910.

Awards
Awards he received include the Spanish Campaign Medal and the Philippine Campaign Medal.

References

People from Janesville, Wisconsin
Military personnel from Wisconsin
United States Navy commodores
American military personnel of the Spanish–American War
American military personnel of the Philippine–American War
United States Naval Academy alumni
Burials at Arlington National Cemetery
1945 deaths
1857 births